School For The Gifted is a secondary school located in Gwagwalada, Abuja, Nigeria.

It was formerly known as Government Gifted Secondary School. The school was established in 1993 but commenced its operation in 1994. 

 it is headed by its 7th principal Onimago Ibrahim Saheed.

It comprises Science, Humanities and Business classes for Senior Secondary Education with a motto of "Knowledge for Excellence".

References

Educational institutions established in 1993
1993 establishments in Nigeria
Secondary schools in the Federal Capital Territory (Nigeria)